†Partula eremita was a species of air-breathing tropical land snail, a terrestrial pulmonate gastropod mollusk in the family Partulidae. This species was endemic to Tahaa, French Polynesia. It is now extinct.

References

E
Extinct gastropods
Extinct animals of Oceania
Fauna of French Polynesia
Molluscs of Oceania
Molluscs of the Pacific Ocean
Gastropods described in 1953
Taxonomy articles created by Polbot